Hansard is the traditional name of the transcripts of parliamentary debates in Britain and many Commonwealth countries. It is named after Thomas Curson Hansard (1776–1833), a London printer and publisher, who was the first official printer to the Parliament at Westminster.

Origins
Though the history of the Hansard began in the British parliament, each of Britain's colonies developed a separate and distinctive history. Before 1771, the British Parliament had long been a highly secretive body. The official record of the actions of the House was publicly available but there was no record of the debates. The publication of remarks made in the House became a breach of parliamentary privilege, punishable by the two Houses of Parliament. As the populace became interested in parliamentary debates, more independent newspapers began publishing unofficial accounts of them. The many penalties implemented by the government, including fines, dismissal, imprisonment, and investigations, are reflective of "the difficulties faced by independent newspapermen who took an interest in the development of Upper Canada, and who, in varying degrees, attempted to educate the populace to the shortcomings of their rulers".

Several editors used the device of veiling parliamentary debates as debates of fictitious societies or bodies. The names under which parliamentary debates were published include Proceedings of the Lower Room of the Robin Hood Society and Debates of the Senate of Magna Lilliputia. The Senate of Magna Lilliputia was printed in Edward Cave's The Gentleman's Magazine, which was first published in 1732. The names of the speakers were carefully "filleted"; for example, Sir Robert Walpole was thinly disguised as "Sr. R―t W―le".

In 1771, Brass Crosby, who was Lord Mayor of the City of London, had brought before him a printer by the name of John Miller who dared publish reports of parliamentary proceedings. He released the man, but was subsequently ordered to appear before the House to explain his actions. Crosby was committed to the Tower of London, but when he was brought to trial, several judges refused to hear the case and after protests from the public, Crosby was released. Parliament ceased to punish the publishing of its debates as harshly, partly due to the campaigns of John Wilkes on behalf of free speech. There then began several attempts to publish reports of debates. Among the early successes, the Parliamentary Register published by John Almon and John Debrett began in 1775 and ran until 1813.

William Cobbett (1763–1835), a noted radical and publisher, began publishing Parliamentary Debates as a supplement to his Political Register in 1802, eventually extending his reach back with the Parliamentary History. Cobbett's avocation for the freedom of the press was severely punished by the British Government. On 5 June 1810 William Cobbett stood trial for seditious libel for an article he wrote against the British Government which was published by Thomas Curson Hansard. Cobbett was found "guilty, upon the fullest and most satisfactory evidence". The court sentence read: "The court do adjudge that you, William Cobbett pay to our Lord the King a fine of £1000; that you be imprisoned in His Majesty's gaol of Newgate for the space of two years, and that at expiration of that time you enter into a recognizance to keep the peace for seven years—yourself in the sum of £3000, and two good and sufficient sureties in the sum of £1,000; and further, that you be imprisoned till that recognizance be entered into, and that fine paid". The sentence was described by J. C. Trewin as "vindictive". The Court argued that Thomas Curson Hansard, who had "seen the copy before it was printed, ought not to have suffered it to have been printed at all" and was sentenced to three months imprisonment in the King's Bench Prison.

Cobbett's reports were printed by Thomas Curson Hansard from 1809; in 1812, Cobbett's finances ran asunder and he divested himself of his proprietorship of both the Parliamentary Debates and Parliamentary History, which then "passed into the hands of Hansard in 1812". Cobbett's Parliamentary Debates became Hansard Parliamentary Debates, "abbreviated over time to the now familiar Hansard". From 1829 the name "Hansard" appeared on the title page of each issue. Cobbett and Hansard did not ever employ anyone to take down notes of the debates, which were taken from a multiplicity of sources in the morning newspapers. For this reason, early editions of Hansard are not to be absolutely relied upon as a guide to everything discussed in Parliament.

Hansard outlasted competitors including Almon and Debrett, and the later Mirror of Parliament published by J. H. Barrow from 1828 to 1843; Barrow's work was more comprehensive but he checked each speech with the Member and allowed them to correct anything they wished they had not said. The last attempt at a commercial rival was The Times which published debates in the 1880s. In 1878, a subsidy was granted to the Hansard press and at that point reporters were employed. Despite hiring contract reporters there were still widespread complaints about the accuracy of the debate reports. In 1889, Henry Hansard, the son of Thomas Hansard, broke the family connection with the debates.

In the United Kingdom
The Hansard of today, a comprehensive account of every speech, began in 1909 when Parliament took over the publication and established its own staff of official Hansard reporters. At the same time, the decision was made to publish debates of the two houses in separate volumes, and to change the front cover from orange-red to light blue. A larger page format was introduced with new technology in 1980.

Hansard is not a word-for-word transcript of debates in Parliament. Its terms of reference are those set by a House of Commons select committee in 1893, as being a report which, though not strictly verbatim, is substantially the verbatim report with repetitions and redundancies omitted and with obvious mistakes (including grammatical mistakes) corrected, but which, on the other hand, leaves out nothing that adds to the meaning of the speech or illustrates the argument.

One instance of such an eliminated redundancy involves the calling of MPs to speak in the House of Commons. In that house, the Speaker must call on an MP by name before that member may speak, but Hansard makes no mention of the recognition accorded by the Speaker. Also, Hansard sometimes adds extraneous material to make the remarks less ambiguous. For example, though members refer to each other as "the hon. Member for Constituency Name rather than by name, Hansard adds, in parentheses, the name of the MP being referred to, the first time that MP is referred to in a speech or debate. When an MP simply points at another whose constituency he or she cannot remember, Hansard identifies him or her.

Any interruption to debate will be marked with the word "(Interruption)". This understated phrase covers a variety of situations, ranging from members laughing uproariously to the physical invasion of the chamber. Interjections from seated members, such as heckling during Prime Minister's Questions, are generally only included if the member who is speaking responds to the interjection.

Hansard also publishes written answers – known as written ministerial statements – made by government ministers in response to questions formally posed by members. In 1839, Hansard, by order of the House of Commons, printed and published a report stating that an indecent book published by a Mr. Stockdale was circulating in Newgate Prison. Stockdale sued for defamation but Hansard's defence, that the statement was true, succeeded. On publication of a reprint, Stockdale sued again but Hansard was ordered by the House to plead that he had acted under order of the Commons and was protected by parliamentary privilege. In the resulting case of Stockdale v Hansard, the court found that the house held no privilege to order publication of defamatory material. In consequence, Parliament passed the Parliamentary Papers Act 1840 to establish privilege for publications under the house's authority.

Since 1909—and for important votes before then—Hansard has listed how members have voted in divisions. Furthermore, the proceedings and debates in committee are also published in separate volumes. For many years the House of Commons Hansard did not formally acknowledge the existence of parties in the House, except obliquely, with MPs' references to other MPs of the same party as "hon. Friends", but in 2003 this changed and members' party affiliations are now identified. The Hansard of the House of Lords operates entirely independently of its Commons counterpart, but with similar terms of reference. It covers parliamentary business in the House of Lords chamber itself, as well as the debates in the Moses Room, known as Grand Committee. Parliamentary written answers and statements are also printed. Emma Crewe notes that "Editors view reporters in general as a hive of revolution and anti-establishment attitudes, while they perceive themselves as calm and uncomplaining". The Internet, with the help of volunteers, has made the UK Hansard more accessible. The UK Hansard is currently being digitised to a high-level format for on-line publication. It is possible to review and search the UK Hansard from 1803, with the exception of standing committees.

Because Hansard is treated as accurate, there is a parliamentary convention whereby if a member of Parliament makes an inaccurate statement in Parliament, they must write a correction in the copy of Hansard kept in the House of Commons library.

In 2010 historic copies of Hansard were sent to India in its original volume format and was transformed from the original bound versions into plain text by optical character recognition (OCR) and put on the Internet to enable easy research. In July 2018 this digitised Hansard was vastly improved and merged with the rest of Hansard as previously it was available under two websites and now it is a single website. There are still many 'typos' from the OCR process but readers are encouraged to report them when they are spotted.

Canada

House of Commons
As with the Westminster Hansard, the Canadian version is not strictly verbatim, and is guided by the principle of avoiding "repetitions, redundancies and obvious errors". Unlike the UK House of Commons, members are referred to in the House only by the parliamentary ridings they represent ("The member for Richmond Hill", etc.) or by their cabinet post. Hansard supplies an affiliation the first time each member speaks in the House on a particular day—"Mr. Mathieu Ravignat (Pontiac, NDP)" or "Hon. Lynne Yelich (Minister of State for Western Economic Diversification, CPC)"—and by name only when they rise later to speak.

If interjections give rise to a call for order by the Speaker, they are reported as "Some hon. members: Oh, oh!" The details of the approval or negativing of motions and bills are reported in rather baroque detail:

Translation
Given the bilingual nature of the Canadian federal government, two equivalent Canadian Hansards are maintained, one in French and one in English. This makes it a natural parallel text, and it is often used to train French–English machine translation programs. In addition to being already translated and aligned, the size of the Hansards and the fact that new material is always being added makes it an attractive corpus. However, its usefulness is hindered by the fact that the translations, although accurate in meaning, are not always literally exact.

The Canadian Hansard records make note of the language used by the members of parliament, so as not to misinterpret the words of the person who has the floor. If the member speaks in French, the English Hansard records would state that the member spoke in French and refer the reader to the French Hansard record.

In one instance, during a Liberal filibuster in the Senate of Canada, Senator Philippe Gigantès was accused of reading one of his books only so that he could get the translation for free through the Hansard.

Newfoundland
In Newfoundland the struggle for the free press was much more violent. Henry Winton, editor of Saint John's Ledger, "had his ears cut off and was left unconscious by thugs who had been lying in wait for him after dark". The fate of Winton was to be his printer's as well. 
The Authorities, who were not on friendly terms with the Ledger, made little to no effort to apprehend the culprits. In another case, a "Gentleman by the name Parsons", of the Newfoundland Patriot, "was sentenced to three months imprisonment in another incident".

Nova Scotia
As was the case in many early Canadian regions, the newspapers were the first source of the parliamentary debates. Canada's first newspaper, the Halifax Gazette, was printed on Grafton street in Halifax in 1752. The two most prominent papers in parliamentary reporting were the Acadian Recorder, founded in 1813 by Anthony Henry Holland, and the Free Press, established in 1816 by Edward Ward. Both newspapers reported the debates of the House of Assembly starting in 1817.

The Family Compact of Nova Scotia, nicknamed "the little compact", "viewed the admission of reporters to the Assembly with disdain" and "were not slow to react whenever they felt the slightest affront". There are many cases which exemplify the "struggle to obtain freedom of the press and parliamentary reportings in the Maritimes" as in the case of William Minns in 1823, who was forced to appear before the bar of the house, and William Milne, who was jailed for not being able to pay his debts.

The Novascotian newspaper would soon become Nova Scotia's most prominent paper after its launch in 1824, which was highly influenced by George Young who was instrumental in its establishment. George Young sought permission from the Assembly to report its debates. Permission was granted, yet he was not provided with very many privileges in the House. They didn't make it easy for him and didn't allow him a seat in the lower deck.

In 1827 Joseph Howe bought the Novascotian from Young. "There was no more powerful an advocate of parliamentary debates than Howe". In 1835 Joseph Howe was "prosecuted over a publication of a letter in the Novascotian". He was charged with libel. This case was infamous and is considered to be a "cornerstone in the establishment of freedom of the press in Canada". Howe, who defended himself in court, was found to be Not Guilty. This is why his case is viewed as a milestone in the development of the free press.

Ontario

No official record of the debates in the provincial Legislature was produced before 1944. The debates were reported in various newspapers; the provincial archives clipped and collected these reports in a series of scrapbooks until 1953. The provincial website now posts Hansard online, with records from March 29, 1977, to current.

Alberta
Alberta adopted a Hansard in 1972. From 1905 to 1971, local newspapers reported on legislative proceedings, and from these articles the Legislature Library has compiled a Scrapbook Hansard, which is available online. News reporters were allowed to take handwritten notes in the Chamber, but they could not make sound recordings, and members of the public were not allowed to take notes.

In 1965 a recording system was installed in the Chamber. Initially the Clerk's office provided transcription only for special events, such as throne speeches, but requests from MLAs for transcripts increased, and by 1971 all House proceedings were being recorded. On March 8, 1972, the government introduced a motion to create Alberta Hansard, and the following day they brought forward a motion allowing audio and video recording in the Chamber and also permitting visitors to the galleries to take notes. Assembly standing orders 115 and 116 set out the rules for broadcast media in the Chamber and at committee meetings, respectively.

Hansard staff verifies the names of individuals and entities mentioned in the House. Like other Hansards, Alberta Hansard follows editorial guidelines established in the 19th century, and transcripts are substantially verbatim. Revisions are limited to "the correction of grammar, spelling and punctuation, ensuring that the correct parliamentary forms are observed, and minimizing superfluous repetition and redundancies, but no material alterations shall be made, nor any amendments that would in any way tend to change the sense of what has been spoken."

Transcripts for Legislative Assembly of Alberta proceedings from 1972 onward are available online, and current issues are usually posted within 12 hours of the day's sitting. A transcript for a regular afternoon Assembly sitting of 4.5 hours contains more than 30,000 words. Also available online are transcripts for meetings of committees of the Legislative Assembly from the 1990s onward, earlier for some committees.

British Columbia

No complete official record of the debates in the British Columbia Legislature was produced until 1972; a partial record was issued beginning in 1970. Unlike the Ottawa Hansard, opposition members and government backbenchers are identified only by initial and last name: "A. Wilkinson". Current cabinet ministers have their names prefaced with "Honourable": "Hon. S. Hagen". Interjections giving rise to a call for order by the Speaker are reported only as "Interjection". Other interjections are reported as spoken if they are clearly audible and if they are responded to in some way by the member who has the floor. While the details of approval or negativing of motions and bills closely parallel the House of Commons, the reporting is simplified to a style line ("Motion approved" or "Motion negatived").

Australia
The Parliament of Australia also keeps record of debates, using the term Hansard. The records are published by the State Law Publisher. The Parliament of South Australia was the first convict free Australian colony to use Hansard; where it became a convention from 1857.  The Parliament of Victoria followed the lead of South Australia by introducing the use of Hansard in 1866. The Parliament of New South Wales commenced its Hansard system on 28 October 1879 with the reporting of the Legislative Council at the opening of the Third Session of the Ninth Parliament. In Tasmania, Hansard was not introduced until 1979, commencing on 6 June for the Legislative Council and 12 June for the House of Assembly.

New Zealand

On 9 July 1867 a team of five reporters, led by Chief Reporter C.C.N. Barron, produced the first official report of debates of the New Zealand Parliament. Ever since that day official transcripts of members' speeches in the New Zealand House of Representatives have been continuously published.

Today the New Zealand Hansard is produced by a team of 17 FTE Hansard Editors within the Office of the Clerk of the House of Representatives. Hansard is published on the New Zealand Parliament website each day the House sits, and later indexed bound volumes are produced.

Speeches are transcribed directly from digital recordings of the debate, with staff present in the debating chamber to monitor the debate by recording the sequence of speakers and any interjections. Interjections are reported only if the member speaking replies to them or remarks on them during the course of his or her speech. Hansard Editors follow strict rules on what changes they can make to the words members use in the chamber. Hansard is as close to verbatim as possible, although Hansard Editors remove repetitions and redundancies and make minor grammatical corrections. Members are provided draft copies of their speeches at the same time that the speeches are first published on the Parliament website. Members can request correction of inadvertent factual inaccuracies but they are unable to significantly change what they said in the House.

List of assemblies using the system

 Parliament of the United Kingdom and the UK's devolved institutions
 Parliament of Canada and the Canadian provincial and territorial legislatures
 Parliament of Australia and the Australian state and territory parliaments
 Parliament of South Africa and South Africa's provincial legislatures
 Parliament of Barbados
 East African Legislative Assembly
 New Zealand Parliament
 Legislative Council of Hong Kong
 Parliament of Malaysia and the Malaysian state legislatures
 National Parliament of Papua New Guinea
 Parliament of Singapore
 Legislative Council of Brunei
 Parliament of Sri Lanka
 Parliament of Trinidad and Tobago
 National Assembly of Kenya
 National Assembly of Tanzania
 Parliament of Ghana
 Parliament of Uganda
 Parliament of Mauritius
 Parliament of Jamaica
 National Assembly of Seychelles
 States of Jersey
 States of Guernsey
 Tynwald, the Parliament of the Isle of Man
 National Assembly of Nigeria
 National Assembly of Namibia
 Parliament of Botswana
 Parliament of Zimbabwe

See also
 List of British colonial gazettes
 Congressional Record, the equivalent for the United States
 Court reporter
 Fuddle duddle
 Hansard Society
 Pepper v Hart
 TheyWorkForYou

References

External links

 
 Hansard from 1803 to 2005
 The records of the House of Lords Official Report (Hansard) are held by the UK Parliamentary Archives 
 The records of the Parliamentary Register, 1743-1786 are held by the UK Parliamentary Archives 
 Parliamentary Archives, Hansard Publications and Papers

Transcripts of legislative proceedings
Westminster system